Johann Adolf Friedrich Maier (13 June 1909 – 6 March 1943) was a German rower who competed in three Olympic games from 1928 to 1936. In Los Angeles, he won a silver medal, along with Karl Aletter, Walter Flinsch and Ernst Gaber in the coxless four. In Berlin, he won a gold medal, along with Paul Söllner, Walter Volle, Fritz Bauer and Ernst Gaber in the coxed four. He was killed during World War II while serving in North Africa. Gustav Maier was his elder brother with whom he had competed in the 1928 Olympics.

References

1909 births
1943 deaths
Olympic rowers of Germany
Rowers at the 1932 Summer Olympics
Rowers at the 1936 Summer Olympics
Olympic gold medalists for Germany
Olympic silver medalists for Germany
Olympic medalists in rowing
German male rowers
Medalists at the 1932 Summer Olympics
Medalists at the 1936 Summer Olympics
Sportspeople from Mannheim
Rowers at the 1928 Summer Olympics
German military personnel killed in World War II
Military personnel from Mannheim